Görgülü is a Turkish surname. Notable people with the surname include:

 Ferhat Görgülü (born 1991), Dutch footballer of Turkish descent
 Sercan Görgülü (born 1960), Turkish footballer

See also
 Görgülü, Sivrice

Turkish-language surnames